The Renkonen similarity index (P), is a measure of dissimilarity between two communities (sites), based on relative (proportional) abundances  of individuals of composite species. It was developed by the botanist Olavi Renkonen and published in 1938.

,

 - percentage structure of one set,

 - percentage structure of second set.

The codomain of this distance function ranges from 1 (identical proportional abundances) to 0 (no taxa shared).

See also
Index of dissimilarity

References 

Biodiversity
Index numbers

ru:Коэффициент сходства